The men's light heavyweight was a weightlifting event held as part of the Weightlifting at the 1920 Summer Olympics programme. 1920 was the first time weightlifting was divided into weight categories. Light heavyweight was the second heaviest category, including weightlifters weighing up to 82.5 kilograms. A total of eleven weightlifters from nine nations competed in the event, which was held on 31 August 1920.

Results

References

Sources
 
 

Weightlifting at the 1920 Summer Olympics